Axel Wilson Arthur Disasi Mhakinis Belho (born 11 March 1998) is a French professional footballer who plays as a defender for Ligue 1 club Monaco and the France national team.

Club career

Early career 
A youth academy product of Paris FC, Disasi made his professional debut for the club in a 1–0 loss to Lens on 11 December 2016. He was later transferred to Reims in 2016.

Monaco 
On 7 August 2020, Disasi completed a transfer from Reims to Monaco for a fee of €13 million. He signed a 5-year contract with the club. On 23 August, Disasi made his debut in a league match against his former club Reims. He scored a goal as the match ended 2-2.

International career
Born in France, Disasi is of Congolese and Angolan descent and was called up to the DR Congo U20s for the 2017 Jeux de la Francophonie. 

Disasi was a youth international for France, and on 14 November 2022, was called up to France’s 2022 FIFA World Cup squad, replacing the injured Presnel Kimpembe. On 30 November, he made his debut in a 1–0 group stage loss to Tunisia, becoming the first French international debutant during a World Cup since 1966. Disasi would go on to play in France's 3–1 win over Poland in the round of 16 on 4 December and the defeat on penalties following a 3–3 draw against Argentina in the final on 18 December.

Career statistics

Club

International

Honours
Reims
Ligue 2: 2017–18

France
FIFA World Cup runner-up: 2022

References

External links

Profile at the AS Monaco FC website

1998 births
Living people
People from Gonesse
Footballers from Val-d'Oise
French footballers
Association football defenders
Paris FC players
Stade de Reims players
AS Monaco FC players
Ligue 1 players
Ligue 2 players
France youth international footballers
France international footballers
2022 FIFA World Cup players
Black French sportspeople
French sportspeople of Democratic Republic of the Congo descent
French sportspeople of Angolan descent